The Mission Ballroom is a concert venue located in the RiNo neighborhood of Denver, Colorado. The building opened in August 2019 with a capacity of nearly 4,000 patrons. Operated by AEG Presents Rocky Mountain, the venue is viewed a competitor to the Live Nation operated Fillmore Auditorium.

Background
The ballroom is a project that took 11 years to come to fruition. Chuck Morris, CEO of AEG Presents Rocky Mountains and Pacific Northwest, helped spearhead the project. After searching for the right spot, it was finally settled on the River North Art District, near the historic Denver Coliseum. Works Progress Architecture designed the space with unique flexibility allowing it to transform depending on capacity. The venue can accommodate 2,200 to 3,950 guests in the bowl-like seating arrangement - providing each guest with unrivaled sightlines. With assistance from Westfield Development, the music venue will be the anchor for the North Wynkoop District. This will be a mixed-use development space featuring retail and commercial spaces, a boutique hotel and residential housing. This project is expected to be complete by 2023.

The venue was announced to the public in April 2018, with construction beginning shortly afterwards. Initial designs and concepts were submitted in 2016. Morris cites the Red Rocks Amphitheatre, Brooklyn Steel and The Anthem as design inspiration. Financed by FirstBank, the 60,000 sqft space will provide patrons with a club experience providing clear sight lines and state-of-the-art lighting and sound. With a sound system designed by D&B Audiotechnik, the venue will be the first to use a noise-cancelling system that will eliminate muddled noise caused by sounds emanating from the sides and rear of the system's speakers. 

The space is also designed with a moving stage to accommodate crowds of 2,200 to 3,950. Each configuration can utilize a large dance floor area for general admission, with reserved seating allocated on both sides of the stage. VIP sections are available with a bar area.

Speaking about the venue, Don Strasburg, Co-President of AEG Presents Rocky Mountains and Pacific Northwest stated:"We wanted to come up with a room that was purely focused on live music, but able to function properly for multiple types of audiences [...] We created a front row along the balcony rail that will always be general admission. We know there are certain people who want a higher level of experience, however, it's really important that the energy from the most die-hard fan, no matter what their income, goes directly to the artists."

Construction completed July 2019. The venue opened on August 7, 2019 with a performance by The Lumineers.

References

Music venues in Colorado
Theatres in Denver
2019 establishments in Colorado
Music of Denver
Music venues completed in 2019
Buildings and structures in Denver